The ushnisha is a three-dimensional oval at the top of the head of the Buddha. In Pali scriptures, it is the crown of Lord Buddha, the symbol of his Enlightenment and Enthronement.

Description
The Ushnisha is the thirty-second of the 32 major marks of the Buddha.  The thirty-second of these is that the Buddha has a fleshy or cranial protuberance at the top of his head.  Later sets elaborate that this is covered with hairs that curl in the direction of the sun.

Later on a second definition of Ushnisha was added, which was a flame that ascends from the middle of this protuberance.

Representation
The first representations of the Buddha in the 1st century CE in the Greco-Buddhist art of Gandhara also represent him with a topknot, rather than just a cranial knob. It is thought that the interpretation of the ushnisha as a supernatural cranial protuberance happened at a later date, as the representation of the topknot became more symbolic and its original meaning was lost.

Origins 
Portrayal of Śākyamuni Buddha with an ushnisha has varied throughout history and depended on which school is doing the portrayal. The Sri Lankan Tamrashatiya school, which would later give rise to Theravada, portrayed him as bald and having an ushnisha extending into the sky and beyond the possibility of measurement. The  Gandharan school of Buddhism, however, never portrayed Śākyamuni with the protuberance on the skull, but with the long wavy hair drawn up on the top of the head in a cluster of curls or in a knot concealing the ushnisha.

The Boddhisattva-Cakravartin in Early Buddhism

The Mahāvastu (1.259f) and the Divyāvadāna, as well as the Theravadin Milindapañha, describe the marks of the cakravartin, an idealised world-ruler:  or patka turban, chhatra parasol, "horn jewel" or vajra, whisk and sandals. These were the marks of the kshatriya.

The plastic art of early Mahayana Buddhism in Mathura presents bodhisattvas in a form called  "wearing a turban/hair binding", wielding the mudras for "nonviolent cakravartin rule".

Possible Indus Valley origins 
A bull figurine excavated from Lakhan-jo-Daro from bronze age Indus Valley Civilization has a similar Ushnisha styled knob above its head, its a unique feature and not applied to any other bull figurine indicating intelligence insignia.

See also
Uṣṇīṣa Vijaya Dhāraṇī Sūtra: 
Classes of Tantra in Tibetan Buddhism, the crown-protrusion mentioned in is this same upper-brain-blossoming/development, simply with a different label.

References

Buddhist art